Osienniki  is a village in the administrative district of Gmina Płaska, within Augustów County, Podlaskie Voivodeship, in north-eastern Poland, close to the border with Belarus.

The village has a population of 30,000.

References

Osienniki